The 10 cm schwere Kanone 18 (10 cm sK 18) was a field gun used by Germany in World War II. The German army wanted a new 10.5 cm gun as well as 15 cm howitzer which were to share the same carriage. Guns are heavier than howitzers due to the longer barrel. This also led to the 15 cm sFH 18. As such both weapons had a similar weight and could be carried by a similar carriage. By 1926 Krupp and Rheinmetall had specimen designs, and prototypes were ready by 1930, but was not fielded until 1933–34. Both Krupp and Rheinmetall competed for the development contract, but the Wehrmacht compromised and selected Krupp's carriage to be mated with Rheinmetall's gun.

It sometimes equipped the medium artillery battalion (with the 15 cm sFH 18) of German divisions, but generally was used by independent artillery battalions and on coast defense duties. Some were used as anti-tank guns during the early stages of war on the Eastern Front, as well as on the prototype self propelled gun "Dicker Max". Around 1,500 guns were produced until 1945. After the war it served with the Albanian and Bulgarian armies.

Gallery

References

Sources
 Engelmann, Joachim and Scheibert, Horst. Deutsche Artillerie 1934–1945: Eine Dokumentation in Text, Skizzen und Bildern: Ausrüstung, Gliederung, Ausbildung, Führung, Einsatz. Limburg/Lahn, Germany: C. A. Starke, 1974
 Gander, Terry and Chamberlain, Peter. Weapons of the Third Reich: An Encyclopedic Survey of All Small Arms, Artillery and Special Weapons of the German Land Forces 1939–1945. New York: Doubleday, 1979 
 Hogg, Ian V. German Artillery of World War Two. 2nd corrected edition. Mechanicsville, Stackpole Books, 1997

External links

 https://web.archive.org/web/20170726164134/http://historywarsweapons.com/10-5-cm-kanone-18/
 "Notes on German Divisional Artillery". Tactical and Technical Trends. 27 August 1942. Retrieved 21 July 2010

World War II artillery of Germany
105 mm artillery
Krupp
Rheinmetall
Military equipment introduced in the 1930s